The Bank of Malvern is a historic commercial building at 212 South Main Street in Malvern, Arkansas.  It is a single-story masonry structure, sharing party walls with neighboring buildings in downtown Malvern.  Its lower level is Romanesque in style, with rusticated stone forming an entrance arch on the left, and acting as a piers around the glass display window on the right.  Above this is a lighter brick construction, with bands of decorative terra cotta rising to a parapet.  The building was constructed in 1889, and its upper portion rebuilt in 1896 following a fire.  It is a relatively rare example of Romanesque architecture in the state.

The building was listed on the National Register of Historic Places in 1987.

See also
National Register of Historic Places listings in Hot Spring County, Arkansas

References

Bank buildings on the National Register of Historic Places in Arkansas
Romanesque Revival architecture in Arkansas
Commercial buildings completed in 1889
Buildings and structures in Malvern, Arkansas
National Register of Historic Places in Hot Spring County, Arkansas
1889 establishments in Arkansas